Feel Like Blowing My Horn is an album by blues musician Roosevelt Sykes, recorded in 1970 and released by the Delmark label in 1973.

Reception

AllMusic reviewer Eugene Chadbourne stated: "Producer Bob Koester gets kudos for bringing about a studio session for Sykes involving such a group later in his career. What a great combination of players is involved ... These legendary players hardly sit on their laurels; they use the opportunity to lay down really beautiful music, the rocking and fun-loving spirit of Sykes looking down on all of it like some kind of barbecue munching holy spirit. One of the best recordings on the Delmark label, and that is saying a mouthful".

Track listing
All compositions by Roosevelt Sykes
 "Feel Like Blowing My Horn" – 2:58
 "My Hamstring's Poppin'" – 3:57
 "I'm a Nut" – 3:00
 "Blues Will Prank with Your Soul" – 3:27
 "Sykes Gumboogie" – 4:40
 "Rock-a-Bye Birdie" – 3:09
 "Moving Blues" – 3:54
 "All Days Are Good" – 2:41
 "Eagle-Rock Me, Baby" – 3:11
 "Jubilee Time" – 3:19

Personnel
Roosevelt Sykes – piano, vocals
King Kolax – trumpet
Sax Mallard – clarinet, tenor saxophone
Robert Lockwood Jr. – guitar
Dave Myers – bass
Fred Below – drums

References

Roosevelt Sykes albums
1973 albums
Delmark Records albums
Albums produced by Bob Koester